The Buffalo Beauts are a professional ice hockey team based in Amherst, New York, United States. The team was established in 2015 as one of the four founding franchises of the Premier Hockey Federation (PHF), originally named the National Women's Hockey League (NWHL). They play at Northtown Center in the Buffalo suburb of Amherst. The team played at Harborcenter in downtown Buffalo for their first four seasons. The team has advanced to the Isobel Cup Finals in the NWHL's first four seasons, winning in 2016–17.

History

The Beauts held their first summer free agent camp on May 23 and May 24, 2015. In July 2015, the Beauts signed free agent and 2-time Team USA Olympic goaltender Brianne McLaughlin, making her the first player to sign a contract with the franchise.

The team made its debut at home on October 11, 2015 in a 4–1 loss versus the Boston Pride. During a 5–3 home loss against the Boston Pride on October 25, 2015, Brianne McLaughlin allowed three goals by Brianna Decker, resulting in the first hat trick in NWHL history.

The Beauts finished the regular season third out of four teams. In the semifinals of the inaugural Isobel Cup championships, the Beauts faced the Connecticut Whale. The Whale had a perfect record against the Beauts in the regular season, but the Beauts upset the Whale by winning the last two games in the best-of-three series. They advanced to the championship series, but dropped two games in succession and were swept by the Boston Pride.

On October 7, 2016, Beauts forward Harrison Browne came out as a transgender man and thus became the first openly transgender athlete in professional American team sports. That same year the Beauts won the 2016–17 Isobel Cup Championship in an upset win over the defending champion Boston Pride. This was Buffalo's first professional hockey championship since the Buffalo Bisons of the American Hockey League won the 1970 Calder Cup.

The Beauts signed three superstars from the CWHL's Brampton Thunder on August 31, 2017, adding Jess Jones, Sarah Edney, and Rebecca Vint for the 2017–18 season.

On December 21, 2017, Pegula Sports and Entertainment (PSE), owners of the Buffalo Bills, Buffalo Sabres and Harborcenter, announced it had purchased the Beauts. This made the Beauts the first team in the NWHL not owned by the league and the first professional women's hockey team in North America to be owned by the same organization of its market's NHL team.

On June 27, 2018, the Beauts signed Team Canada goaltender Shannon Szabados. Szabados had previously only played professional hockey on men's leagues such as the Southern Professional Hockey League and is the first woman to record a shutout in men's league.

On December 7, 2018, the Beauts suddenly relieved Ric Seiling as head coach, replacing him with former Buffalo Sabre and Harborcenter Academy of Hockey coach Cody McCormick on an interim basis.

On May 8, 2019, following the announcement of a professional women's hockey player strike, Pegula Sports and Entertainment (PSE) relinquished ownership of the team back to the NWHL. Under Pegula, the Beauts were considered a well-run operation, with the team sharing resources and training facilities with the Sabres and Rochester Americans. Szabados cited the amenities provided to the Beauts' players through the partnership as one of the goals of the strike for the rest of professional women's hockey.

While the Beauts played at the Harborcenter, in the NWHL's largest arena by capacity, they consistently led the NWHL in attendance for the first few seasons until they were surpassed by the Minnesota Whitecaps in 2018–19. The league indicated that it wanted to keep the team playing at the Harborcenter, which is owned by PSE, but the severance also required the team to negotiate an arena lease.

On June 25, 2019, PSE sent a cease and desist letter to the NWHL for using the Beauts' name and brand. As part of the original agreement, PSE obtained the trademarks associated with the team and formed a separate entity called Buffalo Beauts Hockey to operate the team. While PSE verbally agreed to relinquished ownership and operations of the team, the NWHL apparently did not sign the transfer paperwork before the deadline, leading to PSE's cease and desist letter. As PSE still owned the Beauts' branding as of July 2 while the NWHL continued to use the Beauts' name, but the team eventually retained the name. The league then moved the Beauts' home games to the Northtown Center in nearby Amherst prior to the 2019–20 season.

Due to the ongoing COVID-19 pandemic, the 2020–21 NWHL season was scheduled as a single-site bubble tournament to be played over two weeks at Herb Brooks Arena in Lake Placid, New York, from January 23 to February 5, 2021. However, the bubble season came to a premature end following several positive cases of COVID-19. After the Metropolitan Riveters were forced to withdraw on January 28, Buffalo was in last place. The final games of the regular season were rescheduled with the top three teams playing a round-robin for seeding in the Isobel Cup playoffs, while the Beauts would face the Boston Pride in a three-game play-in series for the fourth seed. Prior to the third game on February 1, Connecticut also withdrew from Lake Placid over health and safety concerns, causing the Beauts/Pride series to be for the third and fourth seeds with the Beauts losing the game 1–7. By February 3, the league completely postponed the Isobel Cup playoffs and ended the Lake Placid event. On March 8, the league announced the new schedule for the playoffs to take place on March 26 and 27 at Warrior Ice Arena in Brighton, Massachusetts. Due to the postponement, Connecticut was given the third seed and the Beauts were eliminated from participation in the postseason.

On June 28, 2021, the league announced the sale of the Beauts and Minnesota Whitecaps to a joint partnership of NLTT Ventures, LLC, led by Andy Scurto, and Top Tier Sports, led by Neil Leibman. Scurto was named the team's governor.

Season-by-season records

Team

Current roster 

Coaching staff and team personnel
 Head coach: Rhea Coad
 Assistant coach: Julia DiTondo
 Assistant coach: Mark Zarbo
 Goaltending coach: Shane Madolora
 Video & analytics: Chris Baudo

Team captains 
 Emily Pfalzer, 2015–2017
 Corinne Buie, 2017–2020
 Taylor Accursi, 2020–21
 Marie-Jo Pelletier, 2021-22
 Dominique Kremer, 2022–present

Head coaches 
 Shelley Looney, Ric Seiling 2015–2016
 Ric Seiling and Craig Muni, 2016–2018
 Cody McCormick, 2018–2019
 Pete Perram, 2019–2021
 Rhea Coad, 2021–present

General managers 
 Nik Fattey, 2016–2019
 Cody McCormick, 2019
 Mandy Cronin, 2019–2020
 Nate Oliver, 2020–present

Draft history
Courtney Burke from the Wisconsin Badgers women's ice hockey program became the first player in franchise history to be selected in the inaugural 2015 NWHL Draft. Raised in the state capital of Albany, New York, Burke was also the first defensewoman selected in NWHL Draft history.

2015

The following are the Beauts' selections from the 2015 NWHL Draft of college players in their junior year held on June 20, 2015.  Note: The team has not announced any contract signings from this list to date.  A player who is drafted but does not sign with the organization that selected her, may enter free-agency after completing her senior year.

Media
In local Media the Buffalo Beauts are covered by The Buffalo News and home games are broadcast live by 716 Sports Podcast via Steve Bermel (Play by Play) and Justen Ehrig (color commentary) and games are live-streamed to twitch.tv/nwhl.

Franchise milestones

Awards and honors 
 Megan Bozek, 2017 Defensive Player of the Year Award
 Maddie Elia, 2019 Most Valuable Player
 Hayley Scamurra, 2019 Scoring Champion, 2019 Players' Top Player of the Year
 Shannon Szabados, 2019 Goaltender of the Year
 Blake Bolden, 2019 Defender of the Year
 Carly Jackson, 2021 Foundation Award, 2021 Fans' Three Stars

References

External links

 

 
Sports in Buffalo, New York
Tourist attractions in Buffalo, New York
2015 establishments in New York (state)
Ice hockey clubs established in 2015
Women's ice hockey teams in the United States
Premier Hockey Federation teams
Ice hockey teams in New York (state)
Pegula Sports and Entertainment